These are the list of results that England have played from 1920 to 1929.

1920 
Scores and results list England's points tally first.

1921 
Scores and results list England's points tally first.

1922 
Scores and results list England's points tally first.

1923 
Scores and results list England's points tally first.

1924 
Scores and results list England's points tally first.

1925 
Scores and results list England's points tally first.

1926 
Scores and results list England's points tally first.

1927 
Scores and results list England's points tally first.

1928 
Scores and results list England's points tally first.

1929 
Scores and results list England's points tally first.

Year Box

Notes 

1920–29
1920–21 in English rugby union
1921–22 in English rugby union
1922–23 in English rugby union
1923–24 in English rugby union
1924–25 in English rugby union
1925–26 in English rugby union
1926–27 in English rugby union
1927–28 in English rugby union
1928–29 in English rugby union